The American Comedy Awards were a group of awards presented annually in the United States recognizing performances and performers in the field of comedy, with an emphasis on television comedy and comedy films. They began in 1987, billed as the "first awards show to honor all forms of comedy." In 1989, after the death of Lucille Ball, the statue was named "the Lucy" to honor the comic legend.

The awards ceased after 2001. NBC revived the awards for a single year in May 2014.

History
George Schlatter created and produced the American Comedy Awards that first aired on ABC, then on Comedy Central. Only the title was similar. It was a TV special honoring comedians.
ABC had broadcast a similar awards program for two years in the 1970s; it was called the "American Academy of Humor" and was "founded" by Alan King.

The last ACA ceremony in 2001 was held under the auspices of the cable network Comedy Central; in 2003 that network replaced them with its own Commie Awards in what turned out to be a one-time replacement.  In 2011 Comedy Central created a new annual awards show, The Comedy Awards, which first aired on April 10, 2011.

1987 awards

Creative Achievement Award
 Norman Lear (Presented by Bea Arthur)

Lifetime Achievement Award

Presented for Woman by Walter Matthau, and for Man by Betty White

 Steve Allen
 Woody Allen
 Lucille Ball
 Mel Brooks
 Carol Burnett
 George Burns
 Sid Caesar
 Bette Midler
 Mary Tyler Moore
 Lily Tomlin
 Jonathan Winters
Special Appearance

 Lily Tomlin
 Ed Begley Jr.
 Shirley MacLaine
 Whoopi Goldberg
 Ellen Greene
 George Carlin
 Betty White
 Ed McMahon
 Steven Wright
 Mark Russell

1988 awards

Creative Achievement Award
 Blake Edwards

Lifetime Achievement Award
 George Burns
 Imogene Coca

1989 awards

Creative Achievement Award
 Neil Simon

Lifetime Achievement Award
 Katharine Hepburn
 Red Skelton

1990 awards

Creative Achievement Award
 Garry Marshall

Lifetime Achievement Award
 Art Carney
 Betty White

1991 awards

Creative Achievement Award
 Carl Reiner

Lifetime Achievement Award
 Doris Day
 Jack Lemmon

1992 awards

Creative Achievement Award
 Penny Marshall

Lifetime Achievement Award
 Johnny Carson
 Phyllis Diller

1993 awards

Creative Achievement Award
 Billy Crystal

Lifetime Achievement Award
 Shirley MacLaine
 Richard Pryor

1994 awards

Creative Achievement Award
 Mike Nichols

Lifetime Achievement Award
 Dick Van Dyke
 Elaine May

1995 awards

Creative Achievement Award
 Rodney Dangerfield

Lifetime Achievement Award
 Bob Hope
 Audrey Meadows

1996 awards

Creative Achievement Award
 James Burrows

Lifetime Achievement Award
 Anne Bancroft
 Milton Berle

1997 awards

Creative Achievement Award
 Rob Reiner (Presented by Kathy Bates)

Lifetime Achievement Award

 Walter Matthau
 Debbie Reynolds (Presented by Carrie Fisher)

Special Appearances

 David Alan Grier
 Phil Hartman
 Kathy Griffin
 Kevin Meaney
 Jonathan Winters
 Sid Caesar

1998 awards

Creative Achievement Award
 Frank Oz

Lifetime Achievement Award
 Jerry Lewis

1999 awards

Creative Achievement Award
 Barry Levinson

2000 Awards

Lifetime Achievement Award
 Steve Martin

2001 awards

Lifetime Achievement Award
 George Carlin

2014 awards

Ratings

See also
 Canadian Comedy Awards
 The Comedy Awards
 Mark Twain Prize for American Humor
 BBC Radio New Comedy Awards
 Robert Benchley Society Award for Humor

References

External links
 

American comedy and humor awards
Awards established in 1987
American Broadcasting Company original programming
Fox Broadcasting Company original programming
NBC original programming
Comedy Central original programming
1980s in comedy
1990s in comedy
1987 establishments in the United States